Peter Kasper can refer to:

 Peter Kasper (ice hockey) (born 1974), Austrian ice hockey player
 Peter Kasper (volleyball) (born 1985), Slovak volleyball player